The South Coast Air Quality Management District, also using the acronym South Coast (AQMD), formed in 1976, is the air pollution agency responsible for regulating stationary sources of air pollution in the South Coast Air Basin and the Coachella Valley portion of the Salton Sea Air Basin, in Southern California. The separate California Air Resources Board is responsible for regulating mobile sources (e.g. vehicles) in the air basin.

Basin geography
The South Coast AQMD includes all of Orange County; and the non-desert regions of Los Angeles County, San Bernardino County, and Riverside County including the Coachella Valley.

The South Coast Air Basin area encompassed by the South Coast AQMD amounts to about 10,750 square miles (27,850 square kilometres) and is the second most populated area in the United States. This area has a severe problem with smog, and the South Coast AQMD has been a leader in the nation's efforts to reduce air pollution emissions. The main office is located in the city of Diamond Bar.

Operations
South Coast AQMD develops, adopts and implements an Air Quality Management Plan for bringing the area into compliance with the clean air standards established by national and state governmental legislation.

Air quality and permissible air pollutant emission "rules" are promulgated to reduce emissions from various sources, including specific types of equipment, industrial processes, paints, solvents and certain consumer products. Permits are issued to the pertinent industries and businesses to enforce compliance with the air quality and emission rules, and South Coast AQMD staff conducts periodic inspections to ensure such compliance.

South Coast AQMD's rules apply to businesses ranging from large oil refineries and power plants to gasoline (petrol) fueling stations and dry cleaning plants. There are about 30,000 such businesses operating under South Coast AQMD permits. In general, the agency is limited to establishing rules for regulating stationary sources. Emission standards for mobile sources (automobiles, trucks, buses, railroads, airplanes and marine vessels) are established by the U.S. Environmental Protection Agency and the California Air Resources Board.

Air quality monitoring network
South Coast AQMD also operates an extensive network of air quality monitoring stations (about 40 stations) and issues daily air quality forecasts. The forecasts are made available to the public through newspapers, television, radio, its award-winning smartphone application, social media, its website, and a toll-free Smog Update telephone line.

Air quality and air pollution dispersion modeling
The air quality modeling activities of the South Coast AQMD are one of the functions of the Planning, Rule Development and Area Sources section. That section is also responsible for oversight and commenting upon air pollution dispersion modeling studies performed as part of any environmental impact studies that may be reviewed by or requested by South Coast AQMD. The models that may be utilized include:

California Line Source Dispersion Model (CALINE-4)
AERMOD Model
Hotspots Analysis and Reporting Program (HARP)
U.S. Environmental Protection Agency (EPA)'s Air Quality Models
California Air Resources Board (CARB)'s Air Quality Models

Governing board
South Coast AQMD has a Governing Board of 13 members. Ten of the members are county supervisors and city council members. The remaining three are appointed by California state officials. Current members of the Governing Board include:

 Ben Benoit (Chair), Riverside County cities
 Vanessa Delgado (Vice Chair), California State Senate Rules Committee appointee
 Lisa Bartlett, Orange County Supervisor
 Nithya Raman, Los Angeles City Council
 Michael A. Cacciotti, Eastern Los Angeles County Cities
 Gideon Kracov, Governor's appointee†
 Sheila Kuehl, Los Angeles County Supervisor
 Larry McCallon, San Bernardino County cities
 Veronica Padilla-Campos, California State Assembly Speaker appointee
 V. Manuel Perez, Riverside County Board of Supervisor
 Rex Richardson, Western Los Angeles County cities
 Carlos Rodriguez, Orange County cities
 Janice Rutherford, San Bernardino County Supervisor
†South Coast AQMD member to the California Air Resources Board

The representative for Orange County cities is chosen by the 34 members of the Orange County City Selection Committee. Appointment requires both a majority vote of the committee and a majority vote when weighted by population. In November 2015, Republicans blocked reappointment of Santa Ana Mayor Miguel Pulido, a Democrat, to the board, voting to replace him with Republican Lake Forest Councilman Dwight Robinson.

Administration 
The chief Executive Officer of the South Coast AQMD reports to the Governing Board. The following departments report to the Executive Officer:

Administrative departments
 Legal
 Counsel
 Prosecutor
 Legislative, Public Affairs, and Media
 Finance
 Human Resources
 Information Management

Operational departments
 Engineering and Permitting
 Compliance and Enforcement
 Planning, Rule Development and Implementation
 Monitoring and Analysis
 Technology Advancement Office

Funding for South Coast AQMD
South Coast AQMD utilizes a system of evaluation fees, annual operating fees, emission fees, Hearing Board fees, penalties/ settlements and investments that generate around 73% of its revenue. The remaining 27% of its revenue is from federal grants, California Air Resources (CARB) subvention funds, and California Clean Air Act Motor Vehicle fees.

See also
South Coast Air Basin
California Air Resources Board
California Department of Toxic Substances Control
AP 42 Compilation of Air Pollutant Emission Factors
Environmental remediation
Hal Bernson — former board member.
Clean Air Act (1990)
Clean Air Act (1970)
List of California air districts
U.S. Environmental Protection Agency dispersion models
National Ambient Air Quality Standards—NAAQS 
National Emissions Standards for Hazardous Air Pollutants—NESHAP 
PHEV Research Center
Public Smog
Ventura County Air Pollution Control District

References

External links
Official South Coast Air Quality Management District—SCAQMD website

Air pollution in California
Air pollution organizations
Southern California
Environmental agencies in the United States
Environmental agencies of country subdivisions
Environment of Greater Los Angeles
Special districts of California
Government of Los Angeles County, California
Government of San Bernardino County, California
Government in Orange County, California
Government in Riverside County, California
Government of Los Angeles
Government in Long Beach, California
Atmospheric dispersion modeling
Organizations based in Orange County, California
1976 establishments in California
Environmental organizations based in Los Angeles